Tove Alexandersson (born 7 September 1992) is a Swedish orienteer, ski orienteer, skyrunner and ski mountaineer. She has won a total of 17 gold medals at the World Orienteering Championships and 10 gold medals at the World Ski Orienteering Championships. In 2018, she won the Sky Marathon event at the Skyrunning World Championships, in her second skyrunning race ever. In 2021, she won the combined discipline at the World Championships of Ski Mountaineering. She competes for Stora Tuna OK in orienteering and Alfta-Ösa OK in ski orienteering. Alexandersson holds the record for the number of gold medals in a row at the World Orienteering Championships, winning 11 in a row between 2018 and 2022.

Orienteering

Junior World Championships 
Alexandersson  became Middle Distance Junior World Champion in orienteering in 2009. She was 16 years old at the time, running against competitors up to four years older than her. She maintained her Middle Distance title in both 2010 and 2012, with two further gold medals in the sprint and in the relay, two silvers, and one bronze in the long distance.

World Orienteering Championships 
After her success as a junior prodigy Alexandersson took several years to achieve her gold medal, receiving only silvers and bronzes in 2011, 2012, 2013, 2014 and 2015 despite being one of the favourites.

She made her breakthrough in 2016, a season which saw her take #1 in the world ranking as well as dominate in the Orienteering World Cup and the World Orienteering Championships, where she won both individual forest titles.

In 2017 she continued to dominate at the 2017 World Orienteering Championships in Estonia, where she won all forest classes (Middle, Long and Relay).

In the 2018 WOC she won the silver medal in sprint and the gold medal in mixed sprint relay.

In the 2019 WOC she won the gold medals in the long and middle distances and also participated in the winning Swedish relay team together with Lina Strand and Karolin Ohlsson.

In the 2021 WOC she won gold in all five events, and became the first person to win five gold medals in a single championship. Alexandersson set a record for the number of gold medals in World Orienteering Championships in a row won, winning eleven in a row for four years between 2018 and 2022, before finally coming sixth place in the sprint at the 2022 World Orienteering Championships following several errors.

She also won the Venla Relay in 2018 together with Julia Gross, Anna Mårsell and Magdalena Olsson.

World Championship results

Orienteering World Cup 
Alexandersson won the Orienteering World Cup eight times in a row from 2014 to 2022 (there was no World Cup in 2020 due to the COVID-19 pandemic).

European Orienteering Championships

Ski orienteering 

She won a gold medal in the sprint distance at the 2011 World Ski Orienteering Championships in Sweden. In 2015, she once again won the women's World Ski Orienteering Championships sprint distance event. Alexandersson is one of the few orienteers who participates in both ski orienteering and the more popular foot orienteering. Alexandersson has been dominant in ski orienteering in recent years; at the championships in Russia in 2017 she won three gold medals. In December 2018, Alexandersson became the first athlete to be ranked #1 in three separate disciplines by the International Orienteering Federation (Ski-O, Foot-O Middle and Long and Foot-O Sprint).

Skyrunning 
In 2017 Alexandersson took a surprise victory in the 29 kilometer Limone Extreme SkyRace with a margin of 12 minutes ahead of established skyrunning specialists, and despite taking several downhill running falls that required medical attention to arms, hands and legs.

In September 2018 Alexandersson won a gold medal in the Sky discipline of the biennial Skyrunning World Championships held on the Ring of Steall Skyrace course at Kinlochleven in Scotland.
Said Alexandersson: "I did not have a big expectation of this race because I am new to skyraces but it was a nice day for me. 
It was a fantastic course and it feels amazing to be world champion."

In October 2018 Tove Alexandersson triumphed for the second year in a row in the Limone Extreme SkyRace, this time by a margin of nine minutes. 
This was Alexandersson's third skyrunning race ever, and she remained undefeated.

In July 2020 Alexandersson won the Salomon 27K Fjällmaraton race in Sweden with a new course record.
A few days later she won the 43K Fjällmaraton race, again with a new course record.
In October Alexandersson won the Skyrace des Matheysins in France.
A week later Alexandersson missed victory in a skyrunning race for the first time ever. In the four-day stage race Golden Trail Championship in the Azores she had a huge lead after the first day, but performed increasingly less well over the next three days to finish fourth overall.

In October 2021 Alexandersson won the KM de Chando in Switzerland, where the runners ascend 2,000 vertical meters to the top of Illhorn.

Ski mountaineering
In November 2019 Alexandersson stated that she would limit her ski orienteering competitions during the upcoming winter, in order to practice ski mountaineering. She said that she intended to participate in five world cup competitions plus the upcoming European Championships. Her best result that year was a fifth place finish, but the European championships was cancelled due to the Coronavirus pandemic.

In February 2021, into her second season of Ski mountaineering, Alexandersson won her first World Cup race, following four second place finishes. In March 2021, Alexandersson participated in the World Championships in La Massana, Andorra, becoming the combined world champion, and placing second in the individual event, third in the vertical event, fourth in the sprint event and fifth in the team relay representing Sweden.

Alexandersson would have won the ISMF World Cup Ski Mountaineering overall title in 2021, had she not missed the prize-giving ceremony following the sprint race, held at the world cup final in Madonna di Campiglio. She had finished fifth in the race and, due to a misunderstanding, she was under the impression that only the top three athletes were to attend the ceremony. The mistake resulted in Alexandersson's disqualification and as a consequence the overall title was instead awarded to French competitor Axelle Mollaret, while Alexandersson had to settle for second place.

Awards

Svenska Dagbladet Gold Medal
Tove Alexandersson was awarded the Svenska Dagbladet Gold Medal in early December 2019.

Jerring Award
During Svenska idrottsgalan in January 2020, she received the Jerring Award. She was also awarded "Swedish Sportswoman of the Year 2019".

Notes

References

External links

1992 births
Living people
Swedish orienteers
Female orienteers
Foot orienteers
Ski-orienteers
World Orienteering Championships medalists
World Games silver medalists
Competitors at the 2013 World Games
Swedish sky runners
Skyrunning World Championships winners
Swedish female long-distance runners
World Games medalists in orienteering
Sportspeople from Dalarna County
20th-century Swedish women
21st-century Swedish women
Junior World Orienteering Championships medalists